The common hill myna (Gracula religiosa), sometimes spelled "mynah" and formerly simply known as the hill myna or myna bird, is the myna most commonly sighted in aviculture, where it is often simply referred to by the latter two names. It is a member of the starling family (Sturnidae), resident in hill regions of South Asia and Southeast Asia. The Sri Lanka hill myna, a former subspecies of G. religiosa, is now generally accepted as a separate species G. ptilogenys. The Enggano hill myna (G. enganensis) and Nias hill myna (G. robusta) are also widely accepted as specifically distinct, and many authors favor treating the southern hill myna (G. indica) from the Nilgiris and elsewhere in the Western Ghats of India as a separate species.

The common hill myna is a popular talking bird.  Its specific name religiosa may allude to the practice of teaching mynas to repeat prayers.

Description
This is a stocky jet-black myna, with bright orange-yellow patches of naked skin and fleshy wattles on the side of its head and nape. At about 29 cm length, it is somewhat larger than the common myna (Acridotheres tristis).

It is overall green-glossed black plumage, purple-tinged on the head and neck. Its large, white wing patches are obvious in flight, but mostly covered when the bird is sitting. The bill and strong legs are bright yellow, and there are yellow wattles on the nape and under the eye. These differ conspicuously in shape from the naked eye-patch of the common myna and bank myna (A. ginginianus), and more subtly vary between the different hill mynas from South Asia: in the common hill myna, they extend from the eye to the nape, where they join, while the Sri Lanka hill myna has a single wattle across the nape and extending a bit towards the eyes. In the southern hill myna, the wattles are separate and curve towards the top of the head. The Nias and Enggano hill mynas differ in details of the facial wattles, and size, particularly that of the bill.

Sexes are similar; juveniles have a duller bill.

With the southern, Nias and Enggano hill mynas as separate species, the common hill myna, Gracula religiosa, has seven subspecies, which differ only slightly. In taxonomic order, they are:
 G. r. peninsularis Whistler & Kinnear, 1933 – the Bastar hill myna; central India (the state bird of Chhattisgarh, India)
 G. r. intermedia Hay, 1845 – northwestern Indochina and adjacent northeastern India and southern China
 G. r. andamanensis (Beavan, 1867) – the Andaman hill myna; the Andaman and Nicobar Islands
 G. r. religiosa Linnaeus, 1758 – the eastern hill myna; the Greater Sundas (except Sulawesi) and Peninsular Malaysia
 G. r. miotera Oberholser, 1917 – the Simeulue hill myna; Simeulue Island. Possibly extinct in the wild.
 G. r. batuensis Finsch, 1899 – the Batu hill myna; the Batu and Mentawai Islands
 G. r. palawanensis (Sharpe, 1890) – the Palawan hill myna; Palawan in the Philippines

A 2020 study found that the subspecies G. religiosa miotera likely represents a distinct species and was likely driven to extinction in the wild in the late 2010s due unsustainable collecting for the wildlife trade. The paper recommends rescuing the last genetically pure captive individuals for the purpose of captive breeding. The International Ornithological Congress tentatively recognises it as a subspecies.

Vocalisations

The common hill myna is often detected by its loud, shrill, descending whistles followed by other calls. It is most vocal at dawn and dusk, when it is found in small groups in forest clearings high in the canopy.

Both sexes can produce an extraordinarily wide range of loud calls – whistles, wails, screeches, and gurgles, sometimes melodious and often very human-like in quality. Each individual has a repertoire of three to 13 such call types, which may be shared with some near neighbours of the same sex, being learned when young.  Dialects change rapidly with distance, such that birds living more than 15 km apart have no call-types in common with one another.

Unlike some other birds, such as the greater racket-tailed drongo (Dicrurus paradiseus), the common hill myna does not imitate other birds in the wild, although it is a widely held misconception that they do. On the other hand, in captivity, they are among the most renowned mimics, the only bird, perhaps, on par with the grey parrot (Psittacus erithacus). They can learn to reproduce many everyday sounds, particularly the human voice, and even whistled tunes, with astonishing accuracy and clarity.

Distribution and ecology

This myna is a resident breeder from Kumaon division in India (80° E longitude) east through Nepal, Sikkim, Bhutan and Arunachal Pradesh, the lower Himalayas, terai and foothills up to 2,000 m ASL. Its range continues east through Southeast Asia northeastwards to southern China, and via Thailand southeastwards across northern Indonesia to Palawan in the Philippines. It is virtually extinct in Bangladesh due to habitat destruction and overexploitation for the pet trade. A feral population on Christmas Island has likewise disappeared. Introduced populations exist in Saint Helena, Puerto Rico and perhaps in the mainland United States and possibly elsewhere; feral birds require at least a warm subtropical climate to persist.

This myna is almost entirely arboreal, moving in large, noisy groups of half a dozen or so, in tree-tops at the edge of the forest. It hops sideways along the branch, unlike the characteristic jaunty walk of other mynas. Like most starlings, the hill myna is fairly omnivorous, eating fruit, nectar and insects.

They build a nest in a hole in a tree. The usual clutch is two or three eggs. There is no sexual dimorphism in these birds, which results in a limited possibility of choosing the sex to work with for mating.

Pet trade and conservation

The hill mynas are popular cage birds, renowned for their ability to imitate speech. The widely distributed common hill myna is the one most frequently seen in aviculture. Demand outstrips captive breeding capacity, so they are rarely found in pet stores and usually purchased directly from breeders or importers who can certify the birds are traded legally.

This species is widely distributed and locally common, and if adult stocks are safeguarded, it is able to multiply quickly. On a worldwide scale, the IUCN thus considers the common hill myna a Species of Least Concern. But in the 1990s, nearly 20,000 wild-caught birds, mostly adults and juveniles, were brought into trade each year. In the central part of its range, G. r. intermedia populations have declined markedly, especially in Thailand, which supplied much of the thriving Western market. Its neighbor countries, from where exports were often limited due to political or military reasons, nevertheless supplied a burgeoning domestic demand, and demand in the entire region continues to be very high. In 1992, Thailand had the common hill myna put on CITES Appendix III, to safeguard its stocks against collapsing. In 1997, at the request of the Netherlands and the Philippines, the species was uplisted to CITES Appendix II. The Andaman and Nicobar Islands subspecies G. r. andamanensis and (if valid) G. r. halibrecta, described as "exceedingly common" in 1874, qualified as Near Threatened in 1991. The former is not at all common anymore in the Nicobar Islands and the latter—if distinct—has a very limited range.

Elsewhere, such as on the Philippines and in Laos, the decline has been more localized. It is also becoming increasingly rare in the regions of northeastern India due to capture of fledged birds for the illegal pet trade. In the Garo Hills region, however, the locals make artificial nests of a split-bamboo framework covered with grass, and put them up in accessible positions in tall trees in a forest clearing or at the edge of a small village to entice the mynas to breed there. The villagers are thus able to extract the young at the proper time for easy hand-rearing, making common hill myna farming a profitable, small-scale cottage industry. It helps to preserve the environment, because the breeding birds are not removed from the population, while habitat destruction is curtailed because the mynas will desert areas of extensive logging and prefer more natural forest to plantations. As the mynas can be somewhat of a pest of fruit trees when too numerous, an additional benefit to the locals is the inexpensive means of controlling the myna population: failing stocks can be bolstered by putting out more nests than can be harvested, while the maximum proportion of nestlings are taken when the population becomes too large.

See also
Talking birds

Footnotes

References
 Ali, Salim & Sidney Dillon Ripley (1983). Bird Numbers 1015-1017 [Hill mynas]. In: Handbook of the Birds of India and Pakistan (2nd ed., vol. 5): 191–194. Oxford University Press, New Delhi.
 Clements, J. F. (2007). The Clements Checklist of the Birds of the World. 6th edition. Christopher Helm. .
 Dickinson, E. C. (editor) (2003). The Howard and Moore Complete Checklist of the Birds of the World. 3rd edition. Christopher Helm. .
 elitparrots.ru (2008). Священная майна (Gracula religiosa) ["Hill Myna (G. religiosa)"]. Version of 2008-JAN-22. Retrieved 2009-MAY-22. [in Russian]
 Grimmett, Richard; Inskipp, Carol & Inskipp, Tim (1998): Birds of the Indian Subcontinent. Christopher Helm, London. 
 
 
 Mete A. (2003). "Iron metabolism in mynah birds (Gracula religiosa) resembles human hereditary haemochromatosis" Avian Pathology 32(#6): 625–632.
 Sankaran, R. (1998). An annotated list of the endemic avifauna of the Nicobar islands. Forktail 13: 17–22. PDF fulltext

External links

common hill myna
Talking birds
Birds of Eastern Himalaya
Birds of East India
Birds of Hainan
Birds of South China
Birds of Southeast Asia
common hill myna
common hill myna
Symbols of Chhattisgarh
Symbols of Meghalaya